The Ghost Reporter (Swedish: Spokreportern) is a 1941 Swedish comedy film directed by Schamyl Bauman and starring Åke Söderblom, Thor Modéen and Annalisa Ericson. It was shot at the Centrumateljéerna Studios in Stockholm. The film's sets were designed by the art director Arthur Spjuth.

Cast
 Åke Söderblom as Lasse Nylund
 Thor Modéen as 	Augustus Blomkvist / Emil Blomkvist
 Annalisa Ericson as 	Karin Blomkvist 
 Erik Berglund as 	Tobias Holmgren 
 Eric Abrahamsson as 	John Wester
 John Botvid as 	Nylund
 Torsten Winge as Diplomat
 Hilding Gavle as 	Amanuelo Fernando
 Viran Rydkvist as Ida Karlsson
 Emil Fjellström as 	Hesa Fredrik
 Bror Bügler as Snutfagra Svensson
 Wiktor Andersson as 	Kofots-Lasse 
 Mimi Pollak as 	Ballet Teacher
 Gideon Wahlberg as 	Night Editor
 Erik A. Petschler as 	Diplomat 
 Bror Abelli as 	Dr. Ahlman 
 Folke Algotsson as 	Engineer
 Gunnar Björnstrand as 	Sausage Factory Engineer 
 Artur Cederborgh as 	Editor Jonsson 
 Elly Christiansson as Waitress 
 Åke Claesson as 	Opera Director Fridell 
 Julia Cæsar as Alfhild the Housekeeper 
 Carl Ericson as Handyman 
 Arthur Fischer as Editor Palmgren 
 Axel Högel as Foreman 
 Greta Liming as	Ballet Girl 
 Arne Lindblad as 	Manne Bergström 
 Aurore Palmgren as 	Mrs. Nylund 
 Hilmer Peters as 	Photographer 
 Bellan Roos as 	Woman Cook 
 Gunnel Wadner as Ballet Girl 
 Bojan Westin as 	Ballet Girl
 Carl-Gunnar Wingård as 	Gentleman Waiting Outside 
 Georg Årlin as Editor

References

Bibliography 
 Per Olov Qvist & Peter von Bagh. Guide to the Cinema of Sweden and Finland. Greenwood Publishing Group, 2000.

External links 
 

1941 films
1941 comedy films
Swedish comedy films
1940s Swedish-language films
Films directed by Schamyl Bauman
1940s Swedish films